Bassekou Diabaté (born 15 April 2000) is a Malian professional footballer who plays as a winger for Lechia Gdańsk and the Mali national team.

International career
Diabaté made his professional debut with the Mali national team in a 1–0 2020 African Nations Championship tie with Burkina Faso on 16 January 2021.

Career statistics

Club

References

External links
 
 
 Footballdatabase Profile
 Bassekou Diabaté  at Lechia Gdańsk

2000 births
Living people
Malian footballers
Mali international footballers
Association football forwards
Malian Première Division players
Lechia Gdańsk players
Lechia Gdańsk II players
Ekstraklasa players
IV liga players
Malian expatriate footballers
Malian expatriate sportspeople in Poland
Expatriate footballers in Poland
21st-century Malian people
Sportspeople from Bamako
Mali A' international footballers
2020 African Nations Championship players